The Maxwell–Fricke equation relates the resistivity of blood to hematocrit. This relationship has been shown to hold for humans, and a variety on non-human warm-blooded species, including canines.

Equation
The Maxwell–Fricke equation is written as:

where ρ is the resistivity of blood, ρ1 is the resistivity of plasma, ρ2 is the resistivity of blood cells and φ is the hematocrit.

References 

Mathematics in medicine